The 2019–20 Montana Grizzlies basketball team represents the University of Montana during the 2019–20 NCAA Division I men's basketball season. The Grizzlies, led by sixth-year head coach Travis DeCuire, play their home games at Dahlberg Arena in Missoula, Montana as members of the Big Sky Conference.

Previous season
The Grizzlies finished the 2018–19 season 26–9 overall, 16–4 in Big Sky play, the Grizzlies won the Big Sky regular season championship. As the No. 1 seed in the Big Sky tournament, they defeated Sacramento State, Weber State, and Eastern Washington to win the tournament, and earned the Big Sky's automatic bid to the NCAA tournament.

Given a No. 15 seed in the West Region of the NCAA Tournament, Montana was defeated by Michigan in the first round for the second consecutive year.

Offseason

Departures

Incoming transfers

2019 recruiting class

2020 recruiting class

Roster

Schedule and results

|-
!colspan=9 style=| Non-conference regular season

|-
!colspan=9 style=| Big Sky regular season

|-
!colspan=9 style=| Big Sky tournament

References

Montana Grizzlies basketball seasons
Montana
Montana Grizzlies basketball
Montana Grizzlies basketball